Wharenui K. Hawera (born 22 May 1993) is a New Zealand rugby union player who plays for Kubota Spears. His position of choice is fly-half. Hawera has previously played in Super Rugby for the Brumbies and in the Mitre 10 Cup for Southland and Waikato.

References 

New Zealand rugby union players
Waikato rugby union players
Southland rugby union players
ACT Brumbies players
1993 births
Rugby union players from Hamilton, New Zealand
New Zealand sportsmen
Rugby union fly-halves
Living people
Kubota Spears Funabashi Tokyo Bay players
US Montauban players
Bay of Plenty rugby union players